Schleh is a surname. Notable people with the surname include:

 Hedwig Schleh (1831–1919), German Jewish-Christian actress, feminist, and author
 Jack Schleh, director of the first color cartoon Colonel Bleep
 Tommy Schleh (born 1964), German DJ